The Javan hawk-eagle (Nisaetus bartelsi) is a medium-sized, dark brown raptor in the family Accipitridae. It is the national bird of Indonesia, where it is commonly referred to as Garuda, from the bird-like creatures in Hindu and Buddhist mythology. The scientific name commemorates the Bartels family, who discovered it.

Taxonomy
Because of the plumage variability of Spizaetus eagles, the Javan hawk-eagle was not recognised as a full species until 1953. It was previously placed in Spizaetus. A multi-gene phylogeny of aquiline eagles (Aves: Accipitriformes) reveals extensive paraphyly at the genus level.

Description
Its head and neck are rufous and it is heavily barred black below. This majestic and intricately patterned eagle has a long, black crest on its head; this crest is held almost vertically and is tipped with white. The crown is black, topping a chestnut head and nape. The back and wings are dark brown, fading to a lighter brown tail which has wide cream stripes. The throat is creamy white with a black stripe, running to the whitish breast and underparts, which are heavily barred with chestnut. Juvenile birds are similar in colour, but have plainer underparts and a duller head. The sexes are similar.

Distribution and habitat
An Indonesian endemic, the Javan hawk-eagle occurs in humid tropical forests of Java.  Its range in East Java includes Sempu Island, Bromo Tengger Semeru National Park, Meru Betiri National Park and Alas Purwo National Park. It can also be seen in captivity in zoos like Kebun Binatang Bandung

Behaviour
The Javan hawk-eagle is believed to be monogamous. The female usually lays one egg in a nest high on top of a forest tree. The diet consists mainly of birds, lizards, fruit bats and mammals.

Conservation
It is one of the rarest raptors.  Due to ongoing habitat loss, small population size, limited range and hunting in some areas, it is evaluated as Endangered on the IUCN Red List of Threatened Species. It is listed on Appendix II of CITES.

In February 2012, there were only around 325 pairs of Javan hawk-eagles living in the wild, mainly in Malangbong, West Java and some in East Java. In Central Java, Mount Merapi has been deforested by eruptions and Dieng Plateau has been deforested by agriculture. The adaptation of the bird is very difficult due to their preference for Rasamala trees and Javanese rats for their diet. Ideally the population should be 1,450 pairs and without conservation the eagle is predicted to go extinct by 2025.

References

External links

BirdLife Species Factsheet
Red Data Book

Javan hawk-eagle
National symbols of Indonesia
Birds of Java
Javan hawk-eagle